Hampton High School may refer to:
Morley Senior High School, Noranda, Western Australia. Formerly known as Morley High School.
The Morley Academy, West Yorkshire, England. Formerly known as Morley High School.